Stone and Stone are a German music duo made up of the husband and wife team Glen J. Penniston and Tatjana Cheyenne Penniston.

Glen arrived in Germany in the 1970s and started a career as a drummer, he met Cheyenne in 1979 and in 1989 they married. They formed their musical duo in 1993 and released their first single called I Wish You Were Here was placed 31 in the German charts for 16 weeks, they released their studio album the following year entitled Miracles. In 1994 they divorced.

In 1995 the regional broadcaster Mitteldeutscher Rundfunk chose the Pennistons to represent Germany at the 1995 Eurovision Song Contest with the song "Verliebt in Dich", however this failed to impress the judges and only Malta awarded Germany their only point of the evening. With only 1 point this placed Germany in 23rd and last place, it was the fourth time that the country had finished last in the contest, Germany would finish last again at the 2005, 2015, 2016 and 2022 Contest.

References

Eurovision Song Contest entrants for Germany
Eurovision Song Contest entrants of 1995
German pop music groups
1954 births
1959 births
Living people
German musical duos